Ferrybridge is a village in West Yorkshire, England.  Ferrybridge lies at a historically important crossing of the River Aire which borders the North Yorkshire village of Brotherton. It is linked to other communities by the A1, which follows the route of the Great North Road. The village falls within the Knottingley ward of Wakefield City Council.

The origin of the place-name is from Old Norse and means bridge by the ferry. It appears as Ferie in the Domesday Book of 1086 and as Ferybrig in 1198.

Geography and geology
Geologically, Ferrybridge and Knottingley are located on rich soil, over a bed of Magnesian Limestone.

The area is close to junctions of the M62 and A1(M) motorways; as well as junctions on the rail network, including northward to York, south to Pontefract (and Rotherham), west to both Wakefield and Leeds, east to Goole and south-east to the East Coast Main Line; the River Aire meets the Aire and Calder navigation close to the east of the town.

The area is famous for the Ferrybridge power stations and the M62 services which offers a Burger King, an M&S Simply Food, a Cotton Traders, a WH Smiths, a Greggs, and a Travelodge.

The Ferrybridge power stations to the north dominated the skyline around the village prior to their demolition.

The village

The village has two public houses; "The Golden Lion" which sits by Ferrybridge lock and is steeped in colourful history during its time as a coaching Inn and "The Magnet Inn".

The village has two primary schools, one of which is in the top 250 schools in the country: The Vale Academy was described as "outstanding" in a 2013 Ofsted report. The other is Willow Green Academy, previously known as Roundhill Junior School and Ferrybridge Infant School.

History

An archaeological feature at Ferrybridge is Ferrybridge Henge, a prehistoric ceremonial monument dating back to the Neolithic period, constructed during the period 4,500-1,500 BC, additionally a 2,400-year-old chariot burial has been discovered in the area.

The history of Ferrybridge - and its neighbour, Knottingley - dates back to the establishment of Anglo-Saxon settlements along this stretch of the river.  The respective histories of the two settlements of Ferrybridge and Knottingley are closely linked, bringing glassmaking, shipbuilding, brewing and potteries to the area.

Ferrybridge stands where the Great North Road crosses the River Aire.  In 1198, a bridge was built over the river. The first recorded crossings of the river at Ferrybridge date from the bridge's construction. [In 1228 the bridge collapsed, resulting in the drowning of crusaders passing over at the time. See Christopher Tyerman How To Plan A Crusade (2017), p. 182, citing Calendar of Close Rolls 1227–31, p. 34-35.] The bridge was rebuilt at the end of the 14th century with seven pillars and a chantry chapel at one end.  Until 1810, a toll was payable to cross the bridge.

In March 1461, on the eve of the battle of nearby Towton, an engagement between the Lancastrians and Yorkists ended in a Lancastrian victory, and Lord Fitzwalter, the Yorkist leader was killed.  This is known as the Battle of Ferrybridge.

Up to the end of the 17th century, Knottingley was an important inland port in the West Riding as the River Aire was not navigable beyond it.  The construction of the Aire and Calder Navigation Canal (by a 1699 Act of Parliament; this was the first navigation scheme passed by Act of Parliament) diminished Knottingley's importance as a port by allowing barges on the river to navigate further upstream to Leeds.

Parliament authorized a new canal in 1820.  Cutting through the centre of Knottingley, the new Aire and Calder Navigation Canal was opened in 1826 and connected the new port of Goole with the River Aire at Ferrybridge.  The lock at Ferrybridge opened at 10 a.m. on 20 July 1826.

By the end of the Industrial Revolution, Ferrybridge had become a centre for glass production. The Ferrybridge railway station opened in 1882 on the Swinton and Knottingley Joint Railway (1879) and closed in 1965.

In the 20th century, three power stations were built, all on the same site -  the first in the 1920s, the second in the 1950s, and the third, Ferrybridge 'C' Power Station, in the 1960s; three of the latter's cooling towers collapsed during construction in high winds in 1965. A fourth natural gas power station was expected to be built but because of soaring gas prices this did not go ahead. (see Ferrybridge power stations).

See also
Listed buildings in Knottingley and Ferrybridge
Kellingley Colliery, situated at the other side of Knottingley, West Yorkshire's last operational colliery.

References

External links

Villages in West Yorkshire
Knottingley